Mandla v Dowell-Lee [1982] UKHL 7 is a United Kingdom law case on racial discrimination. It held that Sikhs are to be considered an ethnic group for the purposes of the Race Relations Act 1976.

Background
A Sikh boy was refused entry to Park Grove School, Birmingham by the headmaster because his father refused to make him stop wearing a dastar and cut his hair. The boy went to another school, but the father lodged a complaint with the Commission for Racial Equality (CRE), which brought the case. Derry Irvine, a future Lord Chancellor, appeared for the CRE.

Judgment

Court of Appeal
The CRE lost in the Court of Appeal. Lord Denning, M. R. held the following:

He held that Sikhs were not a racial or ethnic group.

House of Lords
The CRE won the Appeal to the House of Lords, where Lord Fraser of Tullybelton held the following.

He went on to approve the test set out by Richardson, J. in the County Court.

They held that Sikhs were a racial or ethnic group.

Significance
The outcome of this case has been that it has led to a legal definition of the term ethno-religious.

See also

UK employment discrimination law
UK labour law
Human Rights Act 1998
Equality Act 2010

Notes

United Kingdom labour case law
United Kingdom equality case law
House of Lords cases
1982 in case law
1982 in British law
Sikh politics
Sikhism in the United Kingdom
Anti-discrimination law in the United Kingdom
Turbans